Wong Wah-bo was a martial artist and an opera singer of the late Qing Dynasty. Wong Wah-bo is a notable figure in development of martial art Wing Chun, which is known for its poorly documented history, and is recognized as being part of various contemporary Wing Chun lineages' history.

Background
Not much was known about his childhood life except that he was born in Heshan, Guangdong, Qing Empire during the late Jiaqing period of the Qing Dynasty.

From the Daoguang to Xianfeng period, Wong made a living as an opera singer of the Red Boat Opera Company, often played as Guan Yu, and was first trained by Leung Lan-kwai (梁蘭桂) in an unnamed martial arts boxing skill and later with Leung Yee-tai (梁二娣) in exchange for his Six-and-a-Half Point Pole skill.

He retired at the age of 60 and moved to Qingyun Street, Kuai Zi, Foshan. At Foshan he trained his students, whom included Leung Jan, whom he was introduced by Yee-tai. Due to both of them were from Gulao (古勞) Village, Wong taught Leung the whole of the skill set. Leung was noble and his skills were exquisite, he was deeply respected by other martial artists and was known as Mr. Jan of Foshan (佛山贊先生).

When Leung Jan later became an official, this martial arts skill was officially known as Wing Chun, which he was later known as the King of Wing Chun Kuen (詠春拳王).

In popular culture
In the 1981 TVB television drama series Kung Fu Master of Fat Shan, he was portrayed by Chang Yu.

In the 1981 film The Prodigal Son, he was portrayed by Sammo Hung.

In the 2005 TVB television drama series Real Kung Fu, he was portrayed by Yuen Wah.

In the 2006 TVB television drama series Wing Chun, he was portrayed by Sammo Hung.

Bibliography

References

Chinese Wing Chun practitioners
Male Cantonese opera actors
19th-century Chinese male actors
19th-century Chinese male singers
People from Heshan
Male actors from Guangdong
Sportspeople from Guangdong
Singers from Guangdong